Key Center is a census-designated place (CDP) in Pierce County, Washington, United States. The population was 3,692 at the 2010 census. In 2016, the population grew to 3,810. The community is located on Key Peninsula.

References

External links 

Census-designated places in Pierce County, Washington
Census-designated places in Washington (state)